Uhritulet (Finnish: The Sacrificial Fires) is a 1993 historical novel by Finnish author Kaari Utrio. It is set in 14th century Finland. According to journalist Suvi Kerttula, Vaskilintu (1992), Tuulihaukka (1995) and Uhritulet are Utrio's most important works.

Uhritulet has been translated into Swedish (Offereldar, 1998).

References

External links
 

1993 novels
Novels by Kaari Utrio
Tammi (company) books
20th-century Finnish novels
Finnish historical novels
Novels set in the 14th century